This is a list of fire departments in Florida.

Florida Fire and EMS departments

Alachua County
Alachua County Fire Rescue
Cross Creek Volunteer Fire Department
Gainesville Fire Rescue
High Springs Fire Department

Baker County
Baker County EMS
Baker County Fire Rescue

Bay County
 Bay County Fire Rescue 
 Bay County EMS
 Callaway Fire Department 
 Lynn Haven Fire Department 
 Panama City Fire Department 
 Panama City Beach Fire Rescue 
 Parker Fire Department 
 Springfield Fire Department

Bradford County
Bradford County Fire Rescue
Brooker Volunteer Fire Department
Hampton Volunteer Fire Department
Heilbronn Springs Volunteer Fire Department
Lawtey Volunteer Fire Department
New River Volunteer Fire Department
Sampson City Volunteer Fire Department
Starke Fire Department
Theressa Volunteer Fire Department

Brevard County
Brevard County Fire Rescue
Canaveral Fire Department
Cocoa Fire Department
Cocoa Beach Fire Department
Indialantic Fire Department
Melbourne Fire Department
Merritt Island Volunteer Fire Department
Rockledge Fire Department
Satellite Beach Fire Department
Space Coast Regional Airport Fire Rescue
Titusville Fire Department

Broward County
Broward Sheriff Office Fire Rescue
Coconut Creek Fire Rescue 
Coral Springs-Parkland Fire Department
Davie Fire Department
Fort Lauderdale Fire Department
Hollywood Fire Rescue
Lauderdale-by-the-Sea Fire Department
Lauderhill Fire Department
Lighthouse Point Fire Department
Margate Fire Department 
Miramar Fire Department
North Lauderdale Fire Department
Oakland Park Fire Department
Pembroke Pines Fire Department
Plantation Fire Department
Pompano Beach Fire Rescue
Southwest Ranches Fire Department 
Sunrise Fire Rescue
Tamarac Fire Rescue

Calhoun County
Blountstown Fire Department
Magnolia Fire Department
Altha Volunteer Fire Department
Scotts Ferry Volunteer Fire Department

Charlotte County
Charlotte County Fire Rescue
Englewood Fire District
Punta Gorda Fire Department

Citrus County
Citrus County Fire Rescue
Crystal River Fire Department
Inverness Fire Department

Clay County
Clay County Fire Rescue
Orange Park Fire Department

Collier County
Collier County EMS
Greater Naples Fire Rescue
Immokalee-Ave Maria Fire Control District
Marco Island Fire Department
Naples Fire Department
North Collier Fire Rescue

Columbia County
Columbia County Fire Rescue

Desoto County
Desoto County Fire Rescue

Dixie County
Cross City Fire Department
Dixie County EMS
Dixie County Fire Services

Duval County
 Jacksonville Fire Department

Escambia County
Escambia County EMS
Escambia County Fire Rescue
Pensacola Fire Department

Flagler County
Flagler Beach Fire Department
Flagler County Fire Rescue
Palm Coast Fire Department

Franklin County
Alligator Point Volunteer Fire Department
Apalachicola Fire Department
Carrabelle Volunteer Fire Department
Eastpoint Volunteer Fire Department
St. George Island Volunteer Fire Department

Gadsden County
Chattahoochee Volunteer Fire Department
Concord Volunteer Fire Department
Gadsden County EMS
Greensboro Volunteer Fire Department
Gretna Volunteer Fire Department
Havana Volunteer Fire Department
Midway Volunteer Fire Department
Mt. Pleasant Volunteer Fire Department
St. Johns Volunteer Fire Department
Sycamore Volunteer Fire Department
Wetumpka Volunteer Fire Department

Gilchrist County
Gilchrist County Fire Rescue

Glades County
Buckhead Ridge Volunteer Fire Department
Glades County Fire/Rescue
Lakeport Volunteer Fire Department
Moore Haven Volunteer Fire Department
Muse Volunteer Fire Department
Ortona Volunteer Fire Department
Indian Hills Volunteer Fire Department
Palmdale Volunteer Fire Department

Gulf County
Dalkeith Volunteer Fire Department
Gulf County Beaches Fire Volunteer Fire Department
Gulf County EMS
Highland View Volunteer Fire Department
Howard Creek Volunteer Fire Department
Overstreet Volunteer Fire Department
Port St. Joe Volunteer Fire Department
South Gulf County Volunteer Fire Department
Stone Mill Creek Volunteer Fire Department
Wetappo Creek Volunteer Fire Department
Wewahitchka Volunteer Fire Department
White City Volunteer Fire Department

Hamilton County
Bellville Volunteer Fire Department
Crossroads Volunteer Fire Department
Genoa Volunteer Fire Department
Hamilton County EMS
Jasper Volunteer Fire Department
Jennings Volunteer Fire Department
White Springs Volunteer Fire Department

Hardee County
Hardee County Fire Rescue

Hendry County
Clewiston Fire Department
Felda Volunteer Fire Department
Hendry County EMS
LaBelle Fire Department
Montura-Flaghole Volunteer Fire Department
Pioneer Plantation Volunteer Fire Department

Hernando County
Brooksville Fire Department
Hernando County Fire Rescue
Spring hill Fire Rescue

Highlands County
Avon Park Fire Department
Desoto City Fire Department
Highlands County EMS
Highlands Lakes Volunteer Fire Department
Lake Placid Volunteer Fire Department
Leisure Lakes Volunteer Fire Department
Lorida Volunteer Fire Department
Sebring Fire Department
Sun 'n Lake Fire District
Venus Volunteer Fire Department
West Sebring Volunteer Fire Department

Hillsborough County
Hillsborough County Fire Rescue
MacDill Air Force Base Fire Rescue
Plant City Fire Department
 Tampa Fire Rescue Department
Temple Terrace Fire Department

Holmes County
Bonifay City Fire Department
Esto Volunteer Fire Department
Gritney Volunteer Fire Department
Holmes County EMS
New Hope Volunteer Fire Department
Pine Log Volunteer Fire Department
Pittman Volunteer Fire Department
Ponce de Leon Volunteer Fire Department
Westville Volunteer Fire Department

Indian River County
Indian River County Fire Rescue
Indian River Shores Fire Department

Jackson County
Jackson County Fire Rescue
Marianna Fire Department
Malone Volunteer Fire Department
Graceville Fire Department

Jefferson County
Jefferson County Fire Rescue
Lloyd Volunteer Fire Department

Lafayette County
Lafayette County Rescue

Lake County
Clermont Fire Department
Eustis Fire Department
Groveland Fire Department
Lake County Fire Rescue
Leesburg Fire Department
Mascotte Fire Department
Minneola Fire Department
Montverde Fire Department
Mt. Dora Fire Department
Tavares Fire Department
The Villages Fire Department
Umatilla Fire Department

Lee County
Alva Fire District
Bayshore Fire District
Boca Grande Fire Department
Bonita Springs Fire District
Captiva Fire Department
Cape Coral Fire Department
Fort Myers Fire Department
Estero Fire Rescue
Fort Myers Beach Fire District
Fort Myers Shores Fire District
Iona-McGregor Fire District
Lee County Port Authority Fire Rescue
Lee County EMS
Lehigh Acres Fire District
Matlacha-Pine Island Fire District
North Fort Myers Fire District
San Carlos Park Fire District
Sanibel Fire District
South Trail Fire District
Tice Fire District
Upper Captiva Fire Department
Useppa Island Fire Department

Leon County
Bradfordville Volunteer Fire Department
Chaires Capitola Volunteer Fire Department
Lake Jackson Fire Rescue
Lake Talquin Volunteer Fire Department
Leon County EMS
Miccosukee Volunteer Fire Department
Tallahassee Fire Department
Woodville Volunteer Fire Department

Levy County
Bronson Fire Department
Cedar Key Volunteer Fire Department
Levy County Fire Rescue

Liberty County
Bristol City Volunteer Fire Department
Hosford-Telogia Volunteer Fire Department
Liberty County EMS
Sumatra Volunteer Fire Department

Madison County
Madison County EMS
Madison Fire Department

Manatee County
Bradenton Fire Department
Cedar Hammock Fire Rescue
East Manatee Fire Rescue
Longboat Key Fire Department
Manatee County EMS
Myakka City Fire District
North River Fire District
Parrish Fire District
Southern Manatee Fire Rescue
Trailer Estates Fire District
West Manatee Fire Rescue

Marion County
Marion County Fire Rescue
Ocala Fire Rescue

Martin County
Martin County Fire Rescue
Stuart Fire Department

Miami Dade County
Coral Gables Fire Department
Hialeah Fire Department
Homestead Air Reserve Base Fire Rescue
Key Biscayne Fire Department
 Miami Fire-Rescue Department
Miami Beach Fire Department
 Miami-Dade Fire Rescue Department

Monroe County
Islamorada Fire Department
Key Largo Fire Rescue
Key West Fire Department
Marathon Fire Department
Monroe County Fire Rescue
Ocean Reef Fire Rescue
Tavernier Volunteer Fire Department

Nassau County
Fernandina Beach Fire Department
Nassau County Fire Rescue

Okaloosa County
Almarante Fire District
Baker Fire District
Blackman Fire District
Crestview Fire Department
Destin Fire Control District
Dorcas Fire District
East Niceville Fire District
Florosa Fire Control District
Fort Walton Beach Fire Department
Holt Fire District
Laurel Hill Volunteer Fire Department
Marry Esther Fire Department
Niceville Fire Department
North Bay Fire Control District
North Okaloosa Fire District
Ocean City-Wright Fire Control District
Okaloosa County EMS
Okaloosa Island Fire Department
Valparaiso Volunteer Fire Department

Okeechobee County
Okeechobee Fire Department
Okeechobee County Fire Rescue

Orange County
Apopka Fire Department
Maitland Fire Department
Ocoee Fire Department
 Orange County Fire Rescue
Orlando Fire Department
Orlando International Airport Fire Rescue
Reedy Creek Fire Department
Winter Garden Fire Department
Winter Park Fire Rescue

Osceola County
Kissimmee Fire Department
Osceola County Fire Rescue
St. Cloud Fire Rescue

Palm Beach County
Boca Raton Fire Rescue
Boynton Beach Fire Department
Delray Beach Fire Rescue
Greenacres Fire Department
North Palm Beach Fire Department 
Palm Beach Fire Rescue
Palm Beach County Fire Rescue
Palm Beach Gardens Fire Rescue
Palm Beach Shores Fire Department
Riviera Beach Fire Department
Tequesta Fire Rescue 
West Palm Beach Fire Rescue

Pasco County
New Port Richey Fire Department
Pasco County Fire Rescue
Port Richey Fire Department
Hudson Fire Rescue

Pinellas County 
Clearwater Fire Rescue
Dunedin Fire Rescue
East Lake Fire Department
Gulfport Fire Department
Largo Fire Rescue
Lealman Fire District
Madiera Beach Fire Rescue
Oldsmar Fire Rescue
Palm Harbor Fire Rescue
Pinellas Park Fire Rescue
Pinellas Suncoast Fire Rescue
Safety Harbor Fire Department
South Pasadena Fire Department
Seminole Fire Department
St. Pete Beach Fire Rescue
St. Petersburg Fire Rescue
St. Pete-Clearwater International Airport Fire Rescue
Tarpon Springs Fire Rescue
Tierra Verde Fire Department
Treasure Island Fire Rescue

Polk County
Auburndale Fire Department
Bartow Fire Department
Davenport Fire Department
Dundee Fire Department
Fort Meade Fire Department
Frostproof Fire Department
Frostproof Volunteer Fire Department 
Haines City Fire Department
Lakeland Fire Department
Lake Alfred Fire Department
Lakeland-Linder Regional Airport Fire Rescue
Lake Wales Fire Department
Polk County Fire Rescue
Winter Haven Fire Department

Putnam County
Palatka Fire Department
Putnam County Fire Rescue

St. Johns County
St. Augustine Fire Department
St. Johns County Fire Rescue

St. Lucie County
St. Lucie County Fire District

Santa Rosa County
Allentown Volunteer Fire Department
Avalon Fire Rescue
Bagdad Fire Rescue
Berrydale Volunteer Fire Department
East Milton Volunteer Fire Department
Gulf Breeze Volunteer Fire Department
Harold Volunteer Fire Department
Holly-Navarre Fire District
Jay Volunteer Fire Department
Midway Fire District
Milton Fire Department
Munson Volunteer Fire Department
Navarre Beach Fire Rescue
Pace Fire Rescue District
Skyline Fire Rescue District

Sarasota County
Nokomis Volunteer Fire Department
North Port Fire Rescue
Sarasota Bradenton Airport Fire Rescue
Sarasota County Fire Rescue
Venice Fire Department

Seminole County
Lake Mary Fire Department
Longwood Fire Department
Oviedo Fire Department
Sanford Fire Department
Sanford Airport Fire Department
Seminole County Fire Rescue

Sumter County
Sumter County Fire Rescue
The Villages Fire Department

Suwannee County
Live Oak Fire Department
Suwannee County Fire Rescue

Taylor County
Taylor County Fire Rescue

Union County
Union County EMS

Volusia County
Daytona Beach Fire Department
Daytona Beach Shores Fire Department
Debary Fire Department
Deland Fire Department
Deltona Fire Department
Edgewater Fire Department
New Smyrna Beach Fire Department
Orange City Fire Department
Ormond Beach Fire Department
Port Orange Fire Department
Volusia County Fire Rescue (Including Daytona Beach Intl. Airport)
Volusia County Emergency Medical Services

Wakulla County
Wakulla County Fire Rescue

Walton County
Argyle Volunteer Fire Dept
City of Defuniak Springs Fire Dept
Liberty Volunteer Fire Dept
South Walton Fire District
Walton County Fire Rescue

Washington County
Washington County Fire Rescue

State of Florida
Florida Forest Service Fire

Florida